"Road to Zion" was the 2nd US single to be taken from Damian Marley's Welcome to Jamrock, while "The Master Has Come Back" was released in Europe.

It contains a sample from "Russian Lullaby" by Ella Fitzgerald.

The song also inspired Nas and Damian Marley to record an EP together, which later turned into the full-length album Distant Relatives released in 2010.

Music video
The video was filmed in Kew Gardens and it features cameos from Chali 2na of Jurassic 5 (on the street), George Clinton and Game being locked up with Nas, and Damian handing out postcards with the Lion of Judah on them. After Nas analyzes the card, he manages to escape the prison he’s in and reunite with the young Marley back in a project hallway.

2005 singles
Damian Marley songs
Nas songs
Songs written by Nas
2005 songs
Universal Records singles
Songs written by Damian Marley